Plymouth Moor View is a constituency represented in the House of Commons of the Parliament of the United Kingdom. It elects one Member of Parliament (MP) by the first past the post system of election and has been represented since 2015 by Johnny Mercer of the Conservative Party.

The seat was created for the 2010 general election and is largely the successor to the former Plymouth Devonport constituency.

Constituency profile
The constituency covers the north of the city, including industries relating to the Royal Navy base.

Boundaries

Plymouth Moor View covers the northern part of Plymouth. The electoral wards which make up the constituency are Budshead, Eggbuckland, Ham, Honicknowle, Moor View, St Budeaux and Southway.

The remaining wards from the City of Plymouth are in the constituencies of Plymouth Sutton and Devonport and South West Devon.

Members of Parliament

Elections

Elections in the 2010s

See also
 List of parliamentary constituencies in Devon

References 

Parliamentary constituencies in Devon
Politics of Plymouth, Devon
Constituencies of the Parliament of the United Kingdom established in 2010